Robert J. Dufford, S.J. (born 1943) is a Jesuit priest, a member of the St. Louis Jesuits musical group and a composer of Catholic liturgical music. One of his songs is "Be Not Afraid." His work is included in such hymnals as Glory and Praise and Gather.

Selected works

 "Be Not Afraid" (1975)
 "Sing to the Mountains" (1975)
 "Like a Shepherd" (1976)
 "All the Ends of the Earth" (1981)
 "St. Louis Jesuit Mass - Holy" (1973)
 "Father, Mercy"

References

External links
 Oregon Catholic Press Bio

1943 births
Living people
20th-century American Jesuits
21st-century American Jesuits
Contemporary Catholic liturgical music